Gordon Henry Alexander Mackintosh (born July 7, 1955) is a former Canadian politician who represented the riding of St. Johns in the Legislative Assembly of Manitoba from 1993 to 2016. He served as a cabinet minister in the New Democratic Party governments of Gary Doer and Greg Selinger.

Early life and career

Mackintosh was born in Fort Frances, Ontario, and was educated at the University of Manitoba.  Before entering politics, Mackintosh worked for the Canadian Human Rights Commission and the Manitoba Human Rights Commission between 1979 and 1984, and also worked as Deputy Clerk of the Manitoba Legislature from 1980 to 1984. He was called to the bar in 1988, served as chair of the Patient's Rights Committee from 1986 to 1992, and was a member of the Rainbow Society and the Manitoba Anti-Poverty Organization.  In his legal career, he specialized in environmental issues, and was also an assistant to Elijah Harper during the Meech Lake constitutional debates of 1990.

Political career

Mackintosh entered provincial politics in September 1993, winning a by-election in the north Winnipeg riding of St. Johns (replacing Judy Wasylycia-Leis, who resigned to run for the federal House of Commons).  Mackintosh won 3232 votes, compared to 878 for his nearest opponent, Liberal Naty Yenkech.  In the provincial election of 1995, Mackintosh was re-elected in St. Johns with 4513 votes, against 1610 for Liberal Bron Gorski.  The general election was won by Gary Filmon's Progressive Conservatives, and Mackintosh joined 22 other New Democrats in the official opposition.

The New Democrats won the election of 1999, and Mackintosh was re-elected in his own riding.  On October 5, he was appointed Minister of Justice and Attorney General and Keeper of the Great Seal with responsibility for Constitutional Affairs, and was also named NDP House Leader. On January 17, 2001, he was charged with responsibility for the Manitoba Public Insurance Corporation Act.

As Attorney General, Mackintosh oversaw the extension of children's rights in the legal system, and supported the creation of Cybertip.ca by Child Find Manitoba to report on online predators and child pornography.  In addition, Mackintosh oversaw new initiatives in aboriginal and community justice, and made efforts to target organized crime in Manitoba. On November 1, 2004, Mackintosh's department announced that it would introduce tough anti-gang legislation, which would permit the province to confiscate the assets of suspected gang members even if no criminal convictions have occurred.

In 2003, Mackintosh supported Bill Blaikie's candidacy to become leader of the federal New Democratic Party.  The New Democrats were re-elected, and Mackintosh was returned in St. Johns with over 72% of the vote.  In September 2006, Mackintosh became Minister of Family Services and Housing, replacing Christine Melnick. Mackintosh was re-elected in the 2007 and 2011 provincial elections.

Post-political career

Mackintosh now teaches political science at the University of Winnipeg.

Electoral history

References 

1955 births
Living people
New Democratic Party of Manitoba MLAs
Canadian people of Scottish descent
Members of the Executive Council of Manitoba
21st-century Canadian politicians